Løvjomås is a village in Froland municipality in Agder county, Norway.

References

Villages in Agder
Froland